The 2005 Malta Cup was a professional ranking snooker tournament that took place from 31 January to 6 February 2005 at the Hilton Conference Centre in Portomaso, Malta.

Stephen Hendry won in the final 9–7 against Graeme Dott. This was the 36th and final ranking event he won in his 27-year professional career.


Prize fund
The breakdown of prize money for this year is shown below:

Winner: £30,000
Runner-up: £15,000
Semi-final: £7,500
Quarter-final: £5,600
Last 16: £4,000
Last 32: £2,500

Last 48: £1,625
Last 64: £1,100
Highest break: £2,000
Maximum break: £20,000
Total: £200,000

Wilcard round

Main draw

Final

Qualifying 

Qualifying for the tournament took place between 30 November and 3 December 2004 at Pontins in Prestatyn, Wales.

Century breaks

Qualifying stage centuries 

 141  Barry Hawkins
 134  Joe Perry
 133  Patrick Wallace
 132  Jimmy Michie
 128  Michael Holt
 127, 110  Shaun Murphy
 126, 116, 107  Neil Robertson
 126  Rory McLeod

 124  Anthony Davies
 122  Barry Pinches
 121  Marcus Campbell
 119  Andrew Norman
 117  Nick Dyson
 115  Ryan Day
 114  Tom Ford
 102  Nigel Bond

Televised stage centuries 
 141, 117, 104  John Higgins
 138, 130, 114, 108, 103, 101, 101, 100  Stephen Hendry
 136, 124  Tom Ford
 120  Neil Robertson
 114  Shaun Murphy
 114  Graeme Dott
 106  Mike Dunn
 106  Barry Hawkins

Notes

References

2005
Malta Cup
Cup
Snooker in Malta